Petar Rakićević (born 4 June 1995) is a Serbian professional basketball player for ZTE KK of the Hungarian first division.

Playing career 
Rakićević started his professional basketball career in 2012 with Mladost Čačak where he played for two seasons in the Second Basketball League of Serbia. Prior to the 2014–15 season, he signed for the Metalac Farmakom of the Basketball League of Serbia and the Adriatic League.

On October 5, 2016, Rakićević signed a three-year contract with the Crvena zvezda mts from Belgrade.
In August 2017, Rakićević was loaned to FMP for the 2017–18 season. On the start of November 2017, he left FMP after appearing in three ABA League games. He averaged 1 point and 1.6 rebounds per game. On 15 November 2017, he moved to Dynamic VIP PAY for rest of the season.

On 3 October 2019, Rakićević signed for Slovenian team Krka.

National team career 
Rakićević was a member of the Serbian U-20 national basketball team that won the gold medal at the 2015 FIBA Europe Under-20 Championship in Italy. Over ten tournament games, he averaged 4.2 points, 3.4 rebounds and 1.6 assists per game.

Career achievements
 Serbian League champion: 1  (with Crvena zvezda: 2016–17)
 Radivoj Korać Cup winner: 1  (with Crvena zvezda: 2016–17)
 Adriatic League champion: 1  (with Crvena zvezda: 2016–17)
 Serbian League Cup winner: 1  (with Vojvodina: 2020–21)

References

External links 
 Profile at aba-liga.com
 Profile at eurobasket.com

1995 births
Living people
ABA League players
Basketball League of Serbia players
BC Dzūkija players
KK Crvena zvezda players
KK Dynamic players
KK FMP players
KK Krka players
KK Metalac Valjevo players
KK Mladost Čačak players
KK Vojvodina players
People from Prokuplje
Serbian expatriate basketball people in Lithuania
Serbian expatriate basketball people in Slovenia
Serbian men's basketball players
Small forwards
Shooting guards